Battle Creek Falls is a waterfall on the west skirt of Mount Timpanogos east of Pleasant Grove, Utah. Access to Battle Creek Falls is from the Battle Creek Trailhead off the Kiwanis Park picnic area. The waterfall plunges into the rock at the base of the cliff without creating a pothole. The base of the waterfall has access directly from the trail. Bridal Veil Falls is on the same mountain side, approximately 10 miles south for Battle Creek Falls.

Geography
Battle Creek and its waterfall are located in a semi-arid to desert climate in one of the main canyons of the Timpanogos massif. The creek flows from a natural spring located upstream of the waterfall. While flow is largest during the snow melt of the spring season, both the creek and the waterfall are perennial.

Common trees include water birch, maple, Douglas fir, spruce, oak, aspen and cottonwood. Wildflowers which might be seen include western coneflower, clematis, penstemon, and balsam root. There is some poison ivy reported in Battle Creek, and stinging nettle.

Name
The waterfall is named after the creek, which is the original name of the city of Pleasant Grove. The name stems from the place where the Battle Creek massacre took place in 1849 between pioneer settlers led by Captain John Scott and a small band of Ute Indians.

See also 
 List of waterfalls in Utah

References

External links

Waterfalls of Utah
Landforms of Utah County, Utah